Bernhard H. Korte (born November 3, 1938 in Bottrop, Germany) is a German mathematician and computer scientist, a professor at the University of Bonn, and an expert in combinatorial optimization.

Biography
Korte earned his doctorate (Doctor rerum naturalium) from the University of Bonn in 1967. His thesis was entitled "Beiträge zur Theorie der Hardy'schen Funktionenklassen" (translated, "Contributions to the theory of Hardy function classes"), and was supervised by Ernst Peschl and Walter Thimm. He earned his habilitation in 1971, and briefly held faculty positions at Regensburg University and Bielefeld University before joining the University of Bonn as a faculty member in 1972. At the University of Bonn, Korte is the director of the Research Institute for Discrete Mathematics.

Korte has been a guest professor at Stanford, Cornell, the University of Waterloo, MIT, Yale and Rutgers University, along with institutions in Rome, Pisa, Barcelona and Rio de Janeiro.

Books
.
.

Awards and honors
In 1997, Korte received the State Prize of Nordrhein-Westfalen, and in 2002 he was awarded the Grand Cross of the Order of Merit of the Federal Republic of Germany. He is also a winner of the Humboldt Prize and a member of the German Academy of Sciences Leopoldina.

References

20th-century German mathematicians
21st-century German mathematicians
German computer scientists
Commanders Crosses of the Order of Merit of the Federal Republic of Germany
1938 births
Living people